Belmond La Résidence Phou Vao is resort on a hilltop on the edge of the UNESCO World Heritage Site of Luang Prabang in Laos. Luang Prabang sits at the junction of the Mekong and Nam Khan rivers.
The resort has large gardens with a spa and swimming pool which directly faces Phou si hill.
It was acquired by Orient-Express Hotels in 2006. In 2014, the company changed its name to Belmond Ltd. and the hotel was renamed Belmond La Résidence Phou Vao.

References

External links
Official website
Belmond.com

Belmond hotels